This is a list of cities designated as National Famous Historical and Cultural Cities (国家历史文化名城) by the State Council of China. China approved 99 National Famous Historical and Cultural Cities in three batches in 1982, 1986 and 1994, and has approved a further 32 cities from August 10, 2001 to November 28, 2016, bringing the total to 131. These cities are distributed in 25 provinces and autonomous regions and 4 municipalities. Jiangsu is the province with the most National Famous Historical and Cultural Cities, having 13; Henan and Shandong are second, each having 9. Zhejiang is 4th with 8 cities, and Guangdong, Sichuan and Yunnan are 5th, each with 7 National Famous Historical and Cultural Cities.

Concept 
According to the Protection Law on Cultural Relics of China, a National Famous Historical and Cultural City is a city with an unusual wealth of cultural relics of high historical value and major revolutionary significance, subject to the approval and announcement of the State Council of PR China. The local government at the county level of the place where the famous city is located must organize the formulation of plans on protection of the famous city and bring that planning into the overall city planning. Measures for the protection of famous city shall be formulated by the State Council.

First batch
The first batch was published on February 8, 1982 by State Council, there are 24 Chinese cities.

24 cities
 Beijing (北京)
 Changsha (长沙) in Hunan
 Chengde (承德) in Hebei
 Chengdu (成都) in Sichuan
 Dali (大理) in Yunnan
 Datong (大同) in Shanxi
 Guangzhou (广州) in Guangdong
 Guilin (桂林) in Guangxi
 Hangzhou (杭州) in Zhejiang
 Jiangling (江陵) in Hubei
 Jingdezhen (景德镇) in Jiangxi
 Kaifeng (开封) in Henan
 Kunming (昆明) in Yunnan
 Lhasa (拉萨) in Tibet
 Luoyang (洛阳) in Henan
 Nanjing (南京) in Jiangsu
 Quanzhou (泉州) in Fujian
 Qufu (曲阜) in Shandong
 Shaoxing (绍兴) in Zhejiang
 Suzhou (苏州) in Jiangsu
 Xi'an (西安) in Shaanxi
 Yan'an (延安) in Shaanxi
 Yangzhou (扬州) in Jiangsu
 Zunyi (遵义) in Guizhou

Second batch
The second batch was published on December 8, 1986 by State Council, there are 38 cities.

38 cities
 Anyang (安阳) in Henan
 Baoding (保定) in Hebei
 Bozhou (亳州) in Anhui
 Changshu (常熟) in Jiangsu
 Chaozhou (潮州) in Guangdong
 Chongqing (重庆)
 Dunhuang (敦煌) in Gansu
 Fuzhou (福州) in Fujian
 Hancheng (韩城) in Shaanxi
 Hohhot (呼和浩特) in Xinjiang
 Huai'an (淮安) in Jiangsu 
 Jinan (济南) in Shandong
 Kashgar (喀什) in Xinjiang
 Langzhong (阆中) in Sichuan
 Lijiang (丽江) in Yunnan
 Nanchang (南昌) in Jiangxi
 Nanyang (南阳) in Henan
 Ningbo (宁波) in Zhejiang
 Pingyao (平遥) in Shanxi
 Shanghai (上海) 
 Shangqiu (商丘县) in Henan
 She County (歙县) in Anhui
 Shenyang (沈阳) in Liaoning 
 Shigatse (日喀则) in Tibet
 Shou County (寿县) in Anhui
 Tianjin (天津) 
 Wuhan (武汉)  in Hubei
 Wuwei (武威) in Gansu
 Xiangfan (襄樊) in Hubei
 Xuzhou (徐州) in Jiangsu
 Yibin (宜宾) in Hubei
 Yinchuan (银川) in Ningxia
 Yulin (榆林) in Shaanxi
 Zhangye (张掖) in Gansu
 Zhangzhou (漳州) in Fujian
 Zhenyuan County (镇江) in Jiangsu
Zhenyuan (镇远) in Guizhou
 Zigong (自贡) in Sichuan

Third batch
The third batch was published on January 4, 1994 by State Council, there are 37 cities.
37 cities
 Tongren (铜仁) in Guizhou
 Changting County (长汀) in Fujian
 Dai County (代县) in Shanxi
 Dujiangyan (都江堰) in Sichuan
 Foshan (佛山) in Guangdong
 Ganzhou (赣州) in Jiangxi
 Gyantse County (江孜) in Tibet
 Handan (邯郸) in Hebei
 Hanzhong (汉中) in Shaanxi
 Harbin (哈尔滨) in Heilongjiang
 Ji'an (集安) in Jiangxi
 Jianshui County (建水) in Yunnan
 Jilin City (吉林) in Jilin
 Haikang County (海康) in Guangdong
 Leshan (乐山) in Sichuan
 Liaocheng (聊城) in Shandong
 Linhai (临海) in Zhejiang
 Liuzhou (柳州) in Guangxi
 Luzhou (泸州) in Sichuan
 Meizhou (梅州) in Guangdong
 Qi County (祁县) in Shanxi
 Qingdao (青岛) in Anhui
 Qiongshan District (琼山) in Haikou, Hainan
 Quzhou (衢州) in Zhejiang
 Suizhou (随州) in Hubei
 Tianshui (天水) in Gansu
 Weishan County (巍山) in Yunnan
 Xianyang (咸阳) in Shaanxi
 Xinjiang County (新绛) in Shanxi
 Xun County (浚县) in Henan
 Yueyang (岳阳) in Hunan
 Zhaoqing (肇庆) in Guangdong
 Zhengding County (正定) in Henan
 Zhengzhou (郑州) in Henan
 Zhongxiang (钟祥) in Hubei
 Zibo (淄博) in Shandong
 Zoucheng (邹城) in Shandong

Supplementary list 
32 cities

References

Historical
Heritage registers in China
Lists of cities in Asia
Lists of populated places in China